The King Clancy Memorial Trophy is a sports award given annually to the National Hockey League (NHL) player who best exemplifies leadership qualities on and off the ice and who has made a significant humanitarian contribution to his community. The winner is chosen by "a special panel of representatives" from the Professional Hockey Writers' Association and the NHL Broadcasters' Association.

The trophy is named in honour of Francis M. "King" Clancy, a former player for the original Ottawa Senators and the Toronto Maple Leafs who later went on to become a coach, referee, and team executive. The trophy was first awarded in 1988 and was presented to the NHL by Maple Leafs owner Harold Ballard, who called Clancy "one of the greatest humanitarians that ever lived". It honours similar community service as the Charlie Conacher Humanitarian Award, which was retired in 1984.

Five teams have had more than one player win the award. Three members of the Vancouver Canucks, Edmonton Oilers, Calgary Flames, and Boston Bruins have won the award, while two members of the New York Islanders, Minnesota Wild, and Detroit Red Wings have also won the award. Ray Bourque and Dave Poulin won it in consecutive years for the Boston Bruins, and Jason Zucker and Matt Dumba won it in consecutive years for the Minnesota Wild. Players from the seven different Canadian teams have won the trophy on 10 of the 28 occasions that it has been awarded. Three members each from the Edmonton Oilers, Calgary Flames, and Vancouver Canucks, as well as one each from the Montreal Canadiens, Ottawa Senators, Toronto Maple Leafs, and the original Winnipeg Jets have won the award. Henrik Sedin is the only player who has won it more than once. Henrik and his brother Daniel are the only recipients to have won the trophy jointly.

Winners

Notes

References

General

Specific

National Hockey League trophies and awards